The Germany women's national under-23 football team represents the female under-23s of Germany and is controlled by the German Football Association, the governing body of football in Germany.

External links
 Under-23 national team at the German Football Association

Under-23
Youth football in Germany
European women's national under-23 association football teams
Women's national under-23 association football teams